Ryland James Clark (born 1999), known professionally as Ryland James, is a Canadian pop singer from Deseronto, Ontario, whose self-titled debut EP was released in 2020.

As a teenager, he was a competitor on the seventh and final season of The Next Star in 2014, finishing in fifth place. Professionally, he uses his middle name as his stage surname, so as to avoid potential confusion with British singer and presenter Rylan Clark-Neal.

He released his debut single "Good to You" in 2017, and followed up in 2019 with "Say Goodbye" and his breakthrough hit "In My Head". Through 2019, he toured as an opening act for Alessia Cara on her The Pains of Growing Tour; in February 2020, his fourth single "Shoulder to Cry On" was released. His self-titled EP was released in August 2020, and was followed in December by the Christmas release A Little Christmas.

James received two Juno Award nominations at the Juno Awards of 2021, for Pop Album of the Year and Breakthrough Artist of the Year.

He came out as queer in February 2021.

He sang the Canadian national anthem at the 2022 NBA All-Star Game.

In 2023, he participated in an all-star recording of Serena Ryder's single "What I Wouldn't Do", which was released as a charity single to benefit Kids Help Phone's Feel Out Loud campaign for youth mental health.

Discography

Extended plays

Singles

As lead artist

As featured artist

Other charted songs

References 

1999 births
Canadian pop singers
People from Belleville, Ontario
Singers from Ontario
Canadian LGBT singers
Queer musicians
Living people
People from Hastings County
21st-century Canadian male singers
21st-century Canadian LGBT people